"One Beer" (stylized in all caps) is a song recorded by American country music singer Hardy, featuring Lauren Alaina and Devin Dawson. It was released in 2019 from Hardy's first mixtape Hixtape, Vol. 1 and debut studio album A Rock released in 2020. The song was written by Hardy, along with Hillary Lindsey and Jake Mitchell.

Content
"One Beer" tells a story about how just a single Bud Light led to an out-of-wedlock pregnancy and a shotgun marriage. Though the twist of fate resulted in the shelving of life plans, there is the ultimate blessing of a happy family of three.

Music video
The official video was uploaded on February 7, 2020. It's the storyline of a couple that welcomes a baby at a young age. The video follows the baby into his childhood years, to his teenage years, and eventually his adult life where he fulfills his life-long dream of becoming a firefighter. Everything comes full-circle near the end of the clip when a dramatic twist finds the man back at his childhood home, which is up in flames.

Commercial performance
"One Beer" reached number one on the Billboard Country Airplay chart dated December 5, 2020, becoming the first number one single for Hardy and Dawson, and the third for Alaina, who previously topped the chart twice in 2017 with "Road Less Traveled" and as featured on Kane Brown's "What Ifs". It also peaked at number four on the Hot Country Songs chart, and at number 33 on the Billboard Hot 100.

Charts

Weekly charts

Year-end charts

Certifications

References

2019 singles
2019 songs
Big Loud singles
Song recordings produced by Joey Moi
Songs written by Hardy (singer)
Hardy (singer) songs
Lauren Alaina songs
Devin Dawson songs
Vocal collaborations
Songs written by Hillary Lindsey
Songs about alcohol